Bicycle culture can refer to a mainstream culture that supports the use of bicycles or to a subculture.  Although "bike culture" is often used to refer to various forms of associated fashion, it is erroneous to call fashion in and of itself a culture.

Cycling culture refers to cities and countries which support a large percentage of utility cycling.  Examples include the Netherlands, Denmark, Germany, Belgium (Flanders in particular), Sweden, Italy, China, Bangladesh and Japan. There are also towns in some countries where bicycle culture has been an integral part of the landscape for generations, even without much official support. That is the case of Ílhavo, in Portugal. North American cities with strong bicycle cultures include Madison, Portland, San Francisco, Boston, Toronto, Montreal, Lincoln, Peoria, and the Twin Cities.

A city with a strong bicycle culture usually has a well-developed cycling infrastructure, including segregated bike lanes and extensive facilities catering to urban bicycles, such as bike racks.

Advocacy and activism subcultures 
In some cities and countries, transportation infrastructure is focused on automobiles, and large portions of the population use cars as their only local mechanical transport. Bicycling advocates include those who advocate for an increase in population-wide commuting, acceptance of cycling, and legislation and infrastructure to promote and protect the safety and rights of cyclists.

Cycling advocacy often aims to improve community bike infrastructure, including aspects such as bike lanes, parking facilities, and access to public transportation.

Within the cycling community, activism may take many forms, and may include creative and practical approaches. These include bike-related music, bike-related films, international exchange of hospitality (Warm Showers), organized bike rides (often noncompetitive—i.e. Critical Mass and World Naked Bike Ride), art bikes displays, printed-word materials (such as blogs, zines and magazines, stickers, and spoke cards), and the publication and distribution of books (such as: Thomas Stevens's  Around the World on a Bicycle, Mark Twain's essay "Taming the Bicycle" and H. G. Wells's novel The Wheels of Chance). There are hundreds of bicycle cooperatives offering spaces for cyclists to replace their own bikes and socialise.

Examples 

Many cities contain subcultures of bicycle enthusiasts that include racers, bicycle messengers, bicycle transportation activists, mutant bicycle fabricators, bicycle mechanics, and bicycle commuters.  Some such groups are affiliated with activism or counterculture groups.  These hybrid groups often organize activities such as competitive cycling, fun rides, protests, and civil disobedience, such as Critical Mass. Some groups work to promote bicycle transportation (community bicycle program); others fix bicycles to give to children or the homeless (Bikes Not Bombs). There are also feminist groups of women of color who promote the empowerment of women through their rides such as Ovarian Psycos.

Bicycle magazines and organizations give awards to cities for being "bicycle friendly". Examples include Boulder, Minneapolis, Austin, Philadelphia, Madison, Seattle, and Portland—all cities that promote bicycle culture.

Midnight Ridazz is a group of bicycle enthusiasts who ride every second Friday of the month in Los Angeles, California to inspire more people to ride bicycles. Rides often exceed 1,000 cyclists. Similar midnight rides such as the Midnight Mystery rides of Portland and Victoria, the bi-monthly Midnight Mass of Vancouver BC, and similar rides across the US and Europe have been growing in popularity.

San Jose Bike Party is another example of a large monthly social ride that regularly exceeds a thousand riders. It occurs on third Fridays of each month after the evening commute. Typically there are two regroup points allowing slower riders to catch up, which include music and food trucks.

Mainstream bike cultures 

Cycling is the norm in countries like the Netherlands and Denmark. In Denmark, 16 percent of all trips are made by bike—and as much as 50 percent of urban populations cycle to work and school. In the Netherlands, 63 percent of Amsterdam residents ride their bikes every day. Strong cycling infrastructure helps encourage cycling in these cities, and so cycling is the fastest, most convenient way to get from one place to another.

Mainstream bike cultures are characterized by notions of function over form. In mainstream bike cultures, there is less of a differentiation between cyclists and the rest of the population. People of all demographics cycle regularly, and most are less concerned about cycling attire and bike performance. It is not uncommon to see people cycle in business attire or on an old rusty bike.

See also
Cycling mobility
Cyclability
Bicycle Film Festival
Bicycle-friendly
Car-free movement
Critical Mass
International Cycling Film Festival
Cycling in Denmark
Cycling in the Netherlands
History of cycling
List of films about bicycles and cycling
Cycling infrastructure
Cycle touring
Utility cycling
Mamil

References

Further reading
 
 "An American in Denmark: Close encounters with European bicycle culture," Grist, August 5, 2013
 "Spin cycle: Copenhagen's rise, fall, and rise again to cycling supremacy." Grist, August 7, 2013
 "Riding lessons for U.S. cities from one of Europe's bike capitals." Grist, August 9, 2013
 Zack Furness, One Less Car: Bicycling and the Politics of Automobility. Temple University Press, 2010.

Culture
Transport culture